Raymond Barkway (1924–1956) ran the 110M high hurdles for Great Britain in the 1948 London Olympics. He was killed in a plane crash he was piloting aged only 32 years old.

References

1924 births
1956 deaths
British male hurdlers
Olympic athletes of Great Britain
Athletes (track and field) at the 1948 Summer Olympics
Alumni of Exeter College, Oxford
People from Croxley Green
Aviators killed in aviation accidents or incidents in England
Victims of aviation accidents or incidents in 1956